Woodbridge is a large suburban housing development, begun in 1975   by The Irvine Company, in the central region of Irvine, California. It covers 2.65 square miles and has two large artificial lakes at its center. It contains four elementary schools, two middle schools (Lakeside and South Lake), and Woodbridge High School. The Interstate 405 forms its southern boundary. Most of the developments were completed by the mid-1990s. In 2013 development began on the first new housing tract in 15 years, consisting of 48 new homes called The Branches.

Woodbridge is located from Irvine Center Drive to the Interstate 405, between Culver Drive and Jeffrey Road.

Boundaries
Woodbridge is bounded by Irvine Center Drive to the north, Culver Drive to the west, Jeffrey Road to the east and the Interstate 405 to the south.

Style and layout
Woodbridge is bisected into two residential segments, called North Lake and South Lake, by a broad strip of retail, commercial and institutional development. The street named Yale Loop encircles the entirety of Woodbridge. it is divided into East and West Yale Loop. Each half of Woodbridge has a lake at its center. The lakes are between three and six feet deep and each is crossed by a large wooden footbridge, owing the village its name. The village is walled off from the rest of Irvine by a row of pine trees and a continuous, -high Privet hedge. Woodbridge, for the most part, is uniformly designed in a New England Cape Cod style.

In Great Streets  by Allan B. Jacobs (MIT Press), Pinewood (street name)  on the Northern edge of the village off the Yale Loop, is cited as one of the great "new urban" streets. Though the suburban style of place makes it difficult to take the "urban" designation seriously, Mr. Jacobs remarks on its gentle curvilinear aspect; there is no other street in Woodbridge that has the same characteristics.  The tract in which Pinewood is the only circular street, it is also noted for its relatively profuse vegetation, particularly rich use of pepper trees, and the natural shake roofs which, in other tracts, have been replaced by steel or cement imitating other materials.

Woodbridge Village Association

Concurrent with opening sales of homes in Woodbridge, the Irvine Company established the Woodbridge Village Association ("WVA"). Headquartered out of the community facility located at 31 Creek Road, the WVA is a master homeowner association, maintaining the commonly owned pools, parks, lakes and trails within the Village.  Smaller "sub" associations maintain individual neighborhoods within Woodbridge.

The WVA has a board of directors, elected from the homeowner's membership of Woodbridge.  Due to the Village's large size, and the number of people subject to the authority of the board, coupled with the size of the WVA's budget and staff, the board and WVA are really not unlike a city council and a small city as opposed to a board for a small homeowner's association.  Adding to this perception, WVA normally holds community events much like a small town during holidays of the year, such as an annual Independence Day parade, events and fireworks.

All homeowners are required to become members when purchasing a home and are required to pay association dues for maintenance and upkeep of common areas.  The WVA provides a number of services to maintain the community facilities including landscaping; maintenance; lifeguard services during the peak summer season at the larger swim and lake facilities; and a security patrol known as Facility Inspectors- part of its community relations department - that patrols and ensures safety at its facilities.

The WVA requires homeowners to submit applications for any home additions or changes to paint colors, to ensure the integrity and uniformity of colors and themes within the Village.  The WVA is sometimes criticized for being authoritarian (like many homeowner associations).

Lakes and facilities

The amenities include two lakes with docks, two beach lagoons, 22 pools (two of which are only for adults), 16 spas, 13 waders, 24 tennis courts, a splash pad, numerous parks with play equipment, volleyball courts, a big wheel park, horseshoe facilities, and a fitness course.  All told, the association owns and operates 41 recreational facilities.

Each of Woodbridge's lakes has a "beach club" next to it, where there is a "lagoon" (a sand-surrounded fresh-water swimming pool that empties into the lake), a dock facility to rent human-driven pedal boats, kayaks, canoes, sailboats, and hydro-bikes. Swimming in the lakes is safe, though technically prohibited for insurance reasons. The beach clubs have two volleyball courts each. South lake has a recreation room and a snack shop in it also, which is only open on the 4th of July and Memorial Day.

There are also two "swim clubs," Stone Creek and Blue Lake, on each side of Woodbridge. These have lifeguards all day 10am-10pm during summer, and weekends 11am-4pm during fall/spring and 12pm-5pm during winter. Stone Creek has a two-meter diving board, and Blue Lake has a one-meter and a three-meter diving board. The Woodbridge swim teams are based out of Stone Creek. Also the pools that have lifeguards are Fallbrook and Woodflower but only in the summer from 10am-5pm. Ashwood has lifeguards like Blue Lake and Stone Creek from 11am-4pm including in the summer. 

Twenty-four tennis courts, twenty of which are lit for night play, pathways, bikeways, and a plethora of recreational parks within the four square miles make Woodbridge a community of interest to young families as well as retirees who enjoy outdoor activities.  Its community tennis club trains young.

Education
Woodbridge is served by the Irvine Unified School District. There is one high school in Woodbridge, Woodbridge High School. There are two middle schools, Lakeside and South Lake. Stone Creek, Meadow Park, Springbrook and Eastshore are the four elementary schools. All of them are California Distinguished, and were named Blue Ribbon Schools.

Woodbridge High School also participates in Decathlon. They placed 2nd in the Orange County competition, in 2015, the students are scheduled to arrive in Sacramento for the state competition.

Number of schools:

Total: 7

Elementary Schools: 4

Middle Schools 2

High School: Woodbridge High School

References 

Villages of Irvine, California
Populated places established in 1975